The Women's 100 metres T38 event at the 2012 Summer Paralympics took place at the London Olympic Stadium on 1 September.

Results

Round 1
Competed 1 September 2012 from 12:04. Qual. rule: first 3 in each heat (Q) plus the 2 fastest other times (q) qualified.

Heat 1

Heat 2

Final
Competed 1 September 2012 at 21:18.

 
Q = qualified by place. q = qualified by time. RR = Regional Record. PB = Personal Best. SB = Seasonal Best. DQ = Disqualified.

References

Athletics at the 2012 Summer Paralympics
2012 in women's athletics
Women's sport in London